Darreh Shir (also Romanized as Darreh Shīr and Darrehshīr) is a village in Pishkuh Rural District, in the Central District of Taft County, Yazd Province, Iran. At the 2006 census, its population was 77, in 40 families.

References 

Populated places in Taft County